Colindres is a town in the northern Spanish province and autonomous community of Cantabria. Located between the cities of Santander and Bilbao, Colindres has a population of 8,453 (INE 2018).

Overview
In Colindres, the Asón River flows into the Cantabrian Sea, forming the Santoña estuary, which is the most important SPA in northern Spain, which is also known as the Santoña, Victoria and Joyel Marshes Natural Park, which Colindres is a part of. The town has the second fishing port in the region.

Its festivities during the summer are very popular in the region, and perhaps the most popular and the one which attracts the most people is the folk music festival SAUGA. Colindres' neighboring city, Laredo, has a long  beach, La Salvé, with more than 5 km. this is the best place of cantabria .

Sister cities
 Le Haillan (France)

Notable people
 

Antonio Laserna (1752–1823), bibliographer and writer

References

External links 

Ayuntamiento de Colindres
SAUGA Folk
Bienvenidos a Colindres – Pictures of Colindres (Spanish)
Colindres - Cantabria 102 Municipios
Paseando por Colindres

Municipalities in Cantabria